The Great Balkhan mouse-like hamster (Calomyscus mystax) is a species of rodent in the family Calomyscidae.
It is found in southwestern Turkmenistan, northern Iran and southern Azerbaijan. It was first discovered by the famed Soviet Zoologist and Ecologist, Daniil Nikolaevich Kashkarov (1878–1941) in 1925.

References

Mouse-like hamsters
Mammals of Afghanistan
Mammals of the Middle East
Mammals of Central Asia
Mammals described in 1925
Taxonomy articles created by Polbot